Sericus is a genus of beetles belonging to the family Elateridae.

The species of this genus are found in Eurasia and Northern America.

Species:
 Sericus bifoveolatus
 Sericus brunneus (Linnaeus, 1758)''

References

Elateridae
Elateridae genera